Lilian Cole  (born 1 August 1985) is a Nigerian football defender who played for the  Nigeria women's national football team  at the 2008 Summer Olympics.

See also
 Nigeria at the 2008 Summer Olympics

References

External links
 
 

1985 births
Living people
Nigerian women's footballers
Nigeria women's international footballers
Place of birth missing (living people)
Footballers at the 2008 Summer Olympics
Olympic footballers of Nigeria
Women's association football defenders
2007 FIFA Women's World Cup players
Delta Queens F.C. players
Igbo people